Nicholas and Alexandra: An Intimate Account of the Last of the Romanovs and the Fall of Imperial Russia is a 1967 biography of the last royal family of Russia by historian Robert K. Massie. 

Massie was inspired to write the book after his own son was diagnosed with hemophilia, which Tsarevich Alexei had suffered.

In 1971, the book was adapted to film, also as Nicholas and Alexandra, directed by American filmmaker Franklin J. Schaffner.

In 1995, Massie published The Romanovs: The Final Chapter, having updated his account of the family with much newly discovered information.

Editions
 Atheneum, 1967
 Victor Gollancz, 1968
 Indigo, 1996
 Ballantine Books, 2000,  
 Black Dog & Leventhal Publishers, 2005, 
 Phoenix, 2000
 The Modern Library, 2012,

See also
 Emperor Nicholas II of Russia
 Empress Alexandra Feodorovna

1967 non-fiction books
Cultural depictions of Nicholas II of Russia
Books about Russian politicians